The cope (known in Latin as pluviale 'rain coat' or cappa 'cape') is a liturgical vestment, more precisely a long mantle or cloak, open in front and fastened at the breast with a band or clasp. It may be of any liturgical colour.

A cope may be worn by any rank of the clergy. If worn by a bishop, it is generally accompanied by a mitre. The clasp, which is often highly ornamented, is called a morse. In art, angels are often shown wearing copes, especially in Early Netherlandish painting.

History

There has been little change in the character of the vestment from the earliest ages. Then as now it was made of a piece of silk or other cloth of semicircular shape, which distinguished it from the earlier form of chasuble, as a chasuble had straight edges sewn together in front. Both are similar in form and origin to the Orthodox phelonion. 

The only noticeable modification which the cope has undergone lies in the disappearance of the hood. Some early examples feature a triangular hood, which was intended to be of practical utility in covering the head in processions, etc., but over time the hood became merely ornamental, and is commonly represented by a sort of shield of embroidery, sometimes adorned with a fringe or tassel. The fact that in many early chasubles, as depicted in the drawings of the eighth and ninth centuries, we see clear traces of a primitive hood, strongly confirms the view that in their origin cope and chasuble were identical, the chasuble being only a cope with its edges sewn together. 

The earliest mention of a cappa is by St. Gregory of Tours, and in the Miracula of St. Furseus where it seems to mean a cloak with a hood. So from a letter written in 787 by Theodemar, Benedictine abbot of Monte Cassino, in answer to a question of Charlemagne about the dress of the monk we learn that what in Gaul was styled cuculla (cowl) was known to the Cassinese monks as cappa. Moreover, the word occurs more than once in Alcuin's correspondence, apparently as denoting a garment for everyday wear. When Alcuin twice observes about a casula which was sent him, that he meant to wear it always at Mass, we may probably infer that such garments at this date were not distinctively liturgical owing to anything in their material or construction, but that they were set aside for the use of the altar at the choice of the owner, who might equally well have used them as part of his ordinary attire. In the case of the chasuble the process of liturgical specialization was completed at a comparatively early date, and before the end of the ninth century the maker of a casula probably knew quite well in most cases whether he intended his handiwork for a Mass vestment or for an everyday outer garment. But in the case of a cappa or cope, this period of specialization seems to have been delayed until much later. The two hundred cappae or copes which appear in a Saint-Riquier inventory in the year 801, a number increased to 377 by the year 831, were thought to be mere cloaks, for the most part of rude material and destined for common wear. It may be that their use in choir was believed to add to the decorum and solemnity of the Divine Office, especially in the winter season. In 831 one of the Saint-Riquier copes is specially mentioned as being of chestnut colour and embroidered with gold. This, no doubt, implies use by a dignitary, but it does not prove that it was as yet regarded as a sacred vestment. In fact, according to the conclusions of Edmund Bishop, who was the first to sift the evidence thoroughly, it was not until the twelfth century that the cope, made of rich material, was in general use in the ceremonies of the Church, at which time it had come to be regarded as the special vestment of cantors. Still, an ornamental cope was even then considered a vestment that might be used by any member of the clergy from the highest to the lowest, in fact even by one who was only about to be tonsured. 

Amongst monks it was the practice to vest the whole community, except the celebrant and the sacred ministers who assisted the celebrant, in copes at High Mass on the greatest festivals, whereas on feasts of somewhat lower grade, the community were usually vested in albs. In this movement the Netherlands, France, and Germany had taken the lead, as we learn from extant inventories. For example, already in 870, in the Abbey of Saint Trond we find "thirty-three precious copes of silk" as against only twelve chasubles, and it was clearly the Cluny practice in the latter part of the tenth century to vest all the monks in copes during high Mass on the great feasts, though in England the regulations of Saint Dunstan and Saint Aethelwold show no signs of any such observance. The custom spread to the secular canons of such cathedrals as Rouen, and cantors nearly everywhere used copes of silk as their own peculiar adornment in the exercise of their functions.

Meanwhile, the old cappa nigra (black cape), or cappa choralis, a choir cape of black material, open or partly open in front, and commonly provided with a functioning hood, still continued in use. While the cope was a liturgical vestment, made of rich, colorful fabric and often highly decorated, the cappa nigra was a practical garment, made of heavy plain black wool and designed to provide warmth in cold weather. Whereas the cope's hood had long since become a non-functional decorative item, the hood of the cappa nigra remained functional. The cappa nigra (black cape) was worn at the Divine Office by the clergy of cathedral and collegiate churches and also by many religious, as, for example, it is retained by the Dominicans during the winter months down to the present day. No doubt the "copes" of the friars, to which so many references in the Wycliffite literature and in the writings of Chaucer and Langland are found, designate their open mantles, which were, we may say, part of their full dress, though not always black in colour. On the other hand, it is worth a note that the cappa clausa, or close cope, was simply a cope or cape sewn up in front for common outdoor use. "The wearing of this", says Bishop, "instead of the cappa scissa, the same cope not sewn up, is again and again enjoined on the clergy by synods and statutes during the late Middle Ages."

Catholic Church

Under all these different forms the cope has not substantially changed its character or shape. The cope is a vestment for processions worn by all ranks of the clergy when assisting at a liturgical function, but it is never worn by the priest and his sacred ministers in celebrating the Mass. At a Pontifical High Mass the cope was worn by the "assistant priest," a priest who assists the bishop who is the actual celebrant. In the Sarum Rite, the Cope was also prescribed for members of the choir at various times.

It is now the vestment assigned to the celebrant, whether priest or bishop, for almost all functions except the Mass when the celebrant wears the chasuble instead. The cope is used, for example, in processions, in the greater blessings and consecrations, at the solemnly celebrated Liturgy of the Hours, in giving Benediction of the Blessed Sacrament, and the celebration of other sacraments outside of Mass. For most of these the celebrant may instead wear simply cassock and surplice or alb, both with the stole, for simpler celebrations. The chasuble, which is properly only worn for Mass, may also be worn during processions and other ceremonies that occur directly before or after Mass, such as the absolutions and burial of the dead, at the Asperges before Mass, and at the blessing and imposition of the ashes on Ash Wednesday, to avoid the need for the celebrant to change vestments.

The Cæremoniale Episcoporum envisages its use by a bishop if presiding at but not celebrating Mass, for the Liturgy of the Hours, for processions, at the special ceremonies on the Feast of the Presentation of the Lord, Lenten gatherings modelled on the "stations" in Rome, Palm Sunday and Corpus Christi. The bishop may use a cope when celebrating outside of Mass the sacraments of baptism, confirmation, matrimony, penance in solemn form, ordination (if not concelebrating), and anointing of the sick. The list in the index of the Cæremoniale Episcoporum continues with several more cases.

As regards liturgical colours, the cope usually follows the color assigned to that day in the liturgical calendar, although white may always be worn for celebrations of a joyful character or before the Blessed Sacrament, and violet may always be worn for celebrations of a penitential character. It may be made of any rich or becoming material, including cloth of gold (which may be used in place of any colour except violet or black). Owing to its ample dimensions and unvarying shape, ancient copes are preserved to us in proportionately greater numbers than other vestments and provide the finest specimens of medieval embroidery we possess. Among these the "Syon Cope" in the Victoria and Albert Museum, London, and the "Ascoli Cope" in the Pinacoteca Civica, Ascoli Piceno, are remarkable as representing the highest excellence of that specially English thirteenth-century embroidery known as the opus anglicanum ('English work'). We are also indebted to the use of copes for some magnificent specimens of the jeweller's craft. The brooch or clasp, meant to fasten the cope in front, and variously called morse, pectoral, bottone, etc., was an object often in the highest degree precious and costly. The work which was the foundation of all the fortunes of Benvenuto Cellini was the magnificent morse which he made for Pope Clement VII. Some admirable examples of these morses still survive.

Papal mantum

The mantum or papal mantle differs little from an ordinary cope except that it is somewhat longer, and is fastened in the front by an elaborate morse. In earlier centuries it was red in colour; red, at the time being the papal colour rather than white. In the eleventh and twelfth centuries the immantatio, or bestowal of the mantum on the newly elected pope, was regarded as specially symbolical of investiture with papal authority: Investio te de papatu romano ut praesis urbi et orbi, "I invest you with the Roman papacy, that you may rule over the city and the world" were the words used in conferring it at the papal coronation. After the Second Vatican Council and the pontificate of Pope Paul VI, the longer mantum fell out of use. His successors have instead used a cope in its place. Some old mantums were converted to copes by being shortened, such as during the pontificate of Pope Benedict XVI.

Cappa magna

The cappa magna (literally, "great cape"), a form of mantle, is a voluminous ecclesiastical vestment with a long train, proper to cardinals, bishops, and certain other honorary prelates. It is however a jurisdictional garment.

The cappa magna is not strictly a liturgical vestment, but only a glorified cappa choralis, or choir cope. That is to say, it is not used when vested as a celebrant at a liturgical service. It is worn in processions or "in choir" (i.e., attending but not celebrating services). Its colour for cardinals is ordinarily red and for bishops violet. Cardinals and papal nuncios are entitled to wear a cappa magna of watered silk.

The cappa magna is ample in volume and provided with a long train and a disproportionately large hood, the lining of the hood is ermine in winter and silk in summer, and was made in such a way as to completely cover not only the back, but also the breast and shoulders. The hood is functional and in earlier times was often placed on the head and covered with the galero. This used to be the custom when the pope created a new cardinal at a consistory. Nowadays, the hood is normally worn over the head only during penitential rites. Previously, cardinals who were members of specific religious orders would wear a cappa magna in the color of their order. Nowadays, the few remaining cardinals who still use this garment wear red.

The motu proprio Valde solliciti of 30 November 1952 ordered that the train of the cappa magna should be shortened by about half (from 15 metres to 7). The 1969 Instruction on the Dress, Titles and Coats-of-arms of Cardinals, Bishops and Lesser Prelates laid down that:
The cappa magna, always without ermine, is no longer obligatory; it can be used only outside of Rome, in circumstances of very special solemnity. (§ 12)

Since then, the cappa magna is hardly ever used except in celebrations according to the pre-1969 liturgical books, as it was used for the ordination of deacons of the Institute of Christ the King Sovereign Priest in 2009.

The Latin Patriarch of Jerusalem still uses the ermine-lined winter cappa, because he is bound by the complex and unalterable rules of the Status quo, an 1852 Ottoman firman which regulates the delicate relations between the various religious groups that care for the religious sites in the Holy Land. This anomaly is most evident at the Midnight Mass on Christmas Eve in Bethlehem.

Use in the Church of England and Anglican Communion

The earliest post-Reformation prayer books of the Church of England contemplated the continued use of the cope, with the 1549 Prayer Book specifying that the priest at Holy Communion should wear "a vestment or cope". It was common, particularly in English cathedrals, for the priest or bishop to wear a cope for Holy Communion from the Restoration. In the contemporary Church of England and the Anglican Communion as a whole, the cope can be worn as a Eucharistic vestment, and sometimes as a non-Eucharistic vestment, in the same manner as that of the Roman Catholic Church. It is also an Anglican tradition for clergy to wear copes on diocesan occasions.

In the Church of England itself, the cope is worn by the Archbishop of Canterbury during the coronation of the Sovereign. Prior to her coronation in 1953, Queen Elizabeth II presented a set of ornate copes to the Canons of Westminster Abbey as a gift.

Use in Lutheran churches

The cope is usually worn only for processions and services of the Divine Office (morning and evening prayers) in most Lutheran denominations. In the Evangelical Lutheran Church in America, which is similar to the churches of the Anglican Communion, the cope is usually worn by the bishop when not serving as the presiding minister at Holy Communion. In the Church of Norway and the Church of Denmark the cope is reserved for use by bishops. It is infrequently worn by clerics in the Lutheran Church–Missouri Synod or other Lutheran denominations, although its use has increased in recent decades.

In the Church of Sweden the cope is regularly worn by bishops together with the mitre, crosier and pectoral cross, but can also be worn by priests on solemn and ceremonial occasions such as when presiding over baptisms, weddings and funerals. Much like in the Roman Catholic Church the cope is not worn as a eucharistic vestment by either bishops or priests, when the chasuble is instead prescribed for both.

Use in universities

As part of academic dress, the University of Cambridge uses a cope known as a cappa clausa which is made of scarlet superfine cloth with the cowl lined and the cape opening edged with white fur and is closed with clasps. This was once the Congregation dress of Doctors of Divinity but has now come to be the Vice-Chancellor's (or his or her deputies') official congregation dress when conferring degrees. Professors, chairs of degree boards, or their deputies presenting candidates for higher doctoral degrees also wear the cope.

The only other place that still uses the cope is the University of the South in America where it is also the official dress of the vice-chancellor. The only difference from the Cambridge cope is that the cape hem is also edged in fur.

The academic cope is similar to the parliamentary robes of prelates in the House of Lords, worn during the British State Opening of Parliament.

See also
Ferraiolo
Mantle (vesture)

Sources and references

External links

Leonard Spiller, Some Notes on Copes 1939
Pinacoteca Ascoli Piceno - wikipedia.it Italy Ascoli Cope

History of clothing
History of clothing (Western fashion)
History of fashion
Roman Catholic vestments
Anglican vestments
Protestant vestments
Lutheran vestments
Robes and cloaks